Cranfield Airport  is an airfield just outside the village of Cranfield, in Bedfordshire, England. It was originally a World War II aerodrome, RAF Cranfield. It is now used for business aviation, private flights, and for research and development activities.

History
It was formally opened on 1 June 1937 and initially became the base for No. 62 Squadron RAF and No. 82 Squadron RAF of No. 1 (Bomber) Group, flying the already obsolete Hawker Hind biplanes.

Both squadrons converted to Blenheim 1s in 1938. 62 Squadron was moved to Singapore in August 1939 where it was destroyed by the invading Japanese Imperial forces. RAF Cranfield's grass airstrip was replaced with three hardened runways in the winter of 1939 and spring of 1940 and became a target for enemy action in the late summer of that year, with mines, bombs and incendiaries dropped on it and the nearby village of Cranfield.

Aircraftsman Vivian Hollowday, serving at the airfield, won the George Cross for the attempted rescue of two crews which crashed there in July and August 1940.

August 1941 saw the fast developing station become a night fighter training centre with the arrival of No. 51 Night fighter Operational Training Unit. This was disbanded after the end of the war in Europe in May 1945 and the airfield became the site for a new College of Aeronautics (now Cranfield University). This college helped develop the highly successful Harrier jump jet and has serviced the Hurricanes and Spitfires of the Battle of Britain Memorial Flight. The UK's sole remaining airworthy Avro Lancaster was based at Cranfield until 1964.

The following units were here at some point:

Description
Cranfield Aerodrome has a CAA Ordinary Licence (number P803) that allows flights for the public transport of passengers or for flying instruction as authorised by the licensee (Cranfield University) situated next to the site.

The airfield is used for a small number of university-related flights in addition to flying schools and private owners. One of the Met Office research aircraft (a BAE 146), operated under the Facility for Airborne Atmospheric Measurements, is usually based on the airfield.

Situated  to the northeast of the M1 motorway and Milton Keynes, the airfield has a large catchment area.

Although the length of the runway means that Cranfield can handle commercial aircraft (up to the size of a Boeing 757), the remaining infrastructure is not suitable for scheduled passenger flights or for the handling of such aircraft.

Navigation aids include:
 ILS/DME equipment for runway 21
 VDF
 GNSS approaches to both runways

Current operations and planned developments
In September 2016, the press reported that until the end of March 2017, the airport would be closed at weekends while a new air traffic control officer (ATCO) was trained; during this period, there would be days when only a single ATCO was available, and on those days, reduced opening hours would operate.  Planned and permanent redistribution of aircraft traffic (PPR) was introduced.  During this period, runway rejuvenation work was also carried out.

In early 2018, the press reported plans to expand the airport's business aviation activities with a new terminal, a hotel and other improvements and to rename the airport 'London' Cranfield Airport. In April 2018, it was reported that Central Bedfordshire Council had granted planning permission for a new 'Air Park', expected to be completed in 2024.

Planned development 
In May 2019, Marshall Aerospace and Defence Group (now called Marshall Group), owners of Cambridge City Airport, announced that their airport would be closed to all traffic by 2030 at the latest. The Group plans to redevelop their Cambridge site for housing and commercial uses. That announcement said that the Group would be deciding between three potential airfields for its continuing operations: Duxford and Wyton in Cambridgeshire, and Cranfield Airport in Bedfordshire. On 6 October 2020, Cranfield University and Marshall Group announced that they had signed an option agreement for the potential relocation of Marshall Aerospace to Cranfield Airport. 

In October 2021, the Group announced that it had decided in favour of the Cranfield option and that "it will leave its current base at Cambridge Airport by 2030". The Group proposes to move its global group headquarters (as well as its Aerospace division) to Cranfield.

References

Citations

Bibliography

External links

Official site
Cranfield Airport from the air
Facility for Airborne Atmospheric Measurements
Control Towers Website: RAF Cranfield

History of Bedfordshire
University and college airports
Airports in England
Airports in Bedfordshire
Airports in the East of England
Airports in the London region
University and college buildings in England
Airport